Ræder or Raeder is a surname. Notable people with the surname include:

Anton Ræder (1855–1941), Norwegian philologist and historian
Cap Raeder (born 1953), American former ice hockey goaltender and coach
Carl Gustav Valdemar Ræder (1837–1887), Danish farmer and writer
Einar Ræder (1896–1976), Norwegian long jumper
Erich Raeder (1876–1960), naval leader in Germany who played a major role in the naval history of World War II
Georg Ræder (1814–1898), Norwegian military officer, railway pioneer and politician
Jacques Ræder (1831–1920), Norwegian military officer
Johan Christopher Ræder (1859–1943), Norwegian military officer
Johan Christopher Ræder (1782–1853) (1782–1853), Norwegian military officer
Johan Georg A. Ræder (1905–1981), Norwegian diplomat
Johan Georg Frederik Ræder (1834–1909), Danish civil servant and writer
Johan Georg Raeder (1889–1959), Norwegian ophthalmologist known for his studies on glaucoma
Johan Georg Ræder (1751–1808) (1751–1808), Norwegian military officer
Lukas Raeder (born 1993), German footballer
Nicolai Ditlev Ammon Ræder (1817–1884), Norwegian jurist and politician
Ole Munch Ræder (1815–1895), Norwegian jurist and diplomatist
Oscar Alexander Ræder (1844–1877), Danish writer
Peter Nicolay Ræder (born 1943), Norwegian diplomat
Rudolf Falck Ræder (1881–1951), Norwegian military officer, engineer and politician for the Liberal Left Party

See also
Rade (disambiguation)
Rader
Rede (disambiguation)
Reder